Auctiva is an eBay auction management system. It was founded in 1998. One of the original members of the eBay Developer Council, Auctiva has provided sellers and merchants with tools designed to help increase their sales volume on eBay. Jeff Schlicht, who founded Auctiva, wrote a program to automate the task of placing listings on eBay. After giving the software to friends and family who enjoyed the convenience it provided, he formed Auctiva, which is used by individuals and businesses attempting to conduct e-commerce through eBay.

Auctiva offers both free and fee-based services, including: free image hosting, auction gallery, auto-relisting, billing support, automatic seller-to-buyer e-mails, free picture uploads, scheduled listings, listing designer, supersizing pictures, and consignment support.

History
In 2011, Auctiva was purchased by Alibaba.

In 2014, Auctiva participated in the development of a new e-Commerce platform with Alibaba called 11 Main.

In 2015, 11 Main was disbanded and Auctiva became part of the OSP company, alongside OpenSky, Vendio and Storenvy. OSP is 37% owned by Alibaba.

References

External links

Jeff Schlict feature
11 Main site

EBay
Companies based in Chico, California
American companies established in 1998
Internet properties established in 1998
Online auction websites of the United States
1998 establishments in California